The fifth season of the ABC reality television series The Bachelorette began on May 18, 2009 with a two-hour premiere. The show features 29-year-old Jillian Harris, an interior designer from Peace River, Alberta, Canada. Harris is the first Canadian Bachelorette in the US franchise. She finished in third place on season 13 of The Bachelor featuring Jason Mesnick. 

The season concluded on July 27, 2009, with Harris accepting a proposal from 29-year-old technology consultant Ed Swiderski. Swiderski is the first person to win in the show's history after quitting in the same season. The couple broke off their engagement in July 2010.

Contestants

Future appearances

The Bachelor
Jake Pavelka was chosen as the bachelor for the fourteenth season of The Bachelor, entitled On the Wings of Love.

Dancing with the Stars
Pavelka competed in the tenth season of Dancing with the Stars. He was partnered with Chelsie Hightower and finished in 7th place.

Bachelor Pad
Kiptyn Locke, Juan Barbieri, David Good, Wes Hayden, and Jesse Kovacs, returned for the first season of Bachelor Pad. Barbieri was eliminated during week 1. Hayden was eliminated during week 4. Kovacs and his partner, Elizabeth Kitt, were eliminated at the beginning of week 6, finishing in 3rd place. Locke and his partner, Tenley Molzahn, were eliminated at the end of week 6, finishing as the runners-up. Good won the season alongside his partner, Natalie Getz.

Pavelka and Michael Stagliano returned for the second season of Bachelor Pad. Pavelka was eliminated during week 3. Stagliano won the competition alongside his partner, Holly Durst.

Stagliano, Ed Swiderski, and Reid Rosenthal, returned for the third season of Bachelor Pad. Stagliano was eliminated during week 5 and Rosenthal during week 3. Swiderski and his partner, Jaclyn Swartz, were eliminated at the end of week 7, finishing in 3rd place.

Bachelor in Paradise
Kovacs returned for the first season of Bachelor in Paradise. He quit the show during week 6.

Call-out order

 The contestant received the first impression rose
 The contestant was voted off by the other contestants but got a rose instead
 The contestant received a rose during a date
 The contestant was eliminated
 The contestant was eliminated during a date
 The contestant quit the competition
 The contestant received a rose during the date but quit the competition
 The contestant won the competition

Episodes

Death of Julien Hug
On November 3, 2010 Harris mourned the death of Julien Hug on her Twitter page. The 35-year-old Hug was discovered dead on a remote stretch of land off a Californian highway on Wednesday. Harris paid tribute to Hug, saying, "Please say a prayer for the loss of a friend this morning. Life is fragile, don't forget to love the ones you love," before adding, "It's very difficult to find the words to express my condolences. But I will always remember Julien's gentle demeanor and kind heart, which will be sadly missed."

Post-show
In July 2010, Jillian and Ed announced their breakup.

Jillian got engaged to Justin Pasutto on December 25, 2016. Jillian and Justin have two children together, Leo George (born August 5, 2016) and Annie Marjorie Bea (born September 28, 2018).

Ed married Natalie Bomke on July 25, 2015. Ed and Natalie have one daughter together, Olive Mae (born May 23, 2020).

Notes

References

External links
The Bachelorette at ABC

2009 American television seasons
The Bachelorette (American TV series) seasons
Television shows filmed in California
Television shows filmed in British Columbia
Television shows filmed in Alberta
Television shows filmed in Pennsylvania
Television shows filmed in Texas
Television shows filmed in Spain
Television shows filmed in Hawaii